Chikan District is a district of the city of Zhanjiang, Guangdong province, People's Republic of China.

Administration 
The Chikan District is separated by 5 urban sub-districts and 3 townships:

References

External links

County-level divisions of Guangdong
Zhanjiang